VietNamNet (abbreviated as VNN) is an online newspaper in Vietnam affiliated to the Ministry of Information and Communications. Its content is published daily in both Vietnamese and English, and cover categories including international news, information technology, sports, music, fashion, online interviews, music, etc.

History
VietNamNet was granted the latest operating license on January 23, 2003 (license number: 27/GP-BVHTT).

On May 15, 2008, it was proposed that VietNamNet's ownership be transferred from VNPT to Vietnam's Ministry of Information and Communications.

In 2019, VietNamNet and Vietnam Post online newspapers were merged.

Hacker attacks
On January 4, 2011, VietNamNet's server was attacked by hackers - who then gained control of hundreds of thousands of computers. At that time, this was the largest denial-of-service attack to have ever happened in Vietnam - some compared it to the case of hackers attacking the US Department of Defense's website in 2009.

Google and McAfee later revealed there was evidence that the hacker groups were affiliated with the Vietnamese government. However, editor-in-chief Nguyễn Anh Tuấn insisted that he did not believe the government was behind this attack.

References

External links
Official Website
Products News

Vietnamese news websites
Internet properties established in 1997
1997 establishments in Vietnam